GAC Motor (short for Guangzhou Automobile Group Motor Co., Ltd.), sometimes simply as GAC, is a Chinese automobile manufacturing company founded in 2008, with headquarters in Guangzhou. Wholly owned by GAC Group, it focuses on making complete vehicles, auto parts and their trading.

GAC Motor made its first foray into overseas markets in 2013. As of November 2021, it has entered the markets of the Middle East, Europe, America, Asia and Africa. In addition, the company set up exclusive distributors in several countries.

History
GAC Motor set up the International Business Department to arrange its overseas export operations in 2013. In the same year, it participated in the Detroit Auto Show for the first time as the only Chinese automaker.

It introduced the GA6 in 2014. The company rolled out its first 7-seat SUV, the GS8, in 2016. In January 2017, it premiered three new models at the Detroit Auto Show, the GS7, the GE3 and the EnSpirit plug-in hybrid concept. In the same year, GAC Motor opened a R&D center in Silicon Valley.

It stepped into Russia in December 2019.

References

External links

Chinese companies established in 2008
Companies based in Guangzhou
GAC Group divisions and subsidiaries